The 2012–13 season was Manchester City Ladies Football Club's 25th season of competitive football and its final season in the FA Women's Premier League. Despite only a fourth-placed finish, Manchester City were given a place in the expanded FA WSL the following season.

Competitions

Premier League National Division

League table

Results summary

Results by matchday

Matches

FA Cup

WPL Cup

Group stage

Knock-out stages

Playing statistics
Appearances (Apps.) numbers are for appearances in competitive games only including sub appearances
Red card numbers denote:   Numbers in parentheses represent red cards overturned for wrongful dismissal.

FA Cup appearance information not presently known

References

12-13